Enrique Wiegand Frödden (20 January 1895−12 June 1947) was a Chilean lawyer and politician who was member of the Chamber of Deputies of Chile.

He taught at the Pontifical Catholic University of Valparaíso.

References

External links
 BCN Profile

1895 births
1947 deaths
20th-century Chilean lawyers
20th-century Chilean politicians
Pontifical Catholic University of Valparaíso alumni
Academic staff of the Pontifical Catholic University of Valparaíso
Conservative Party (Chile) politicians
People from Quillota
Members of the Chamber of Deputies of Chile